James Moiler (9 June 1930 – 4 October 2012) was an Australian politician. He was a Labor member of the Western Australian Legislative Assembly, representing Toodyay from 1971 to 1974 and Mundaring from 1974 to 1977.

References

1930 births
2012 deaths
Members of the Western Australian Legislative Assembly
People from Toodyay, Western Australia
Australian Labor Party members of the Parliament of Western Australia